The California newt or orange-bellied newt (Taricha torosa), is a species of newt endemic to California, in the Western United States. Its skin produces the potent toxin tetrodotoxin.

Subspecies 
Taricha torosa was divided into two subspecies until 2007, when it was determined that the Sierra and coastal populations represent distinct evolutionary lineages. The former subspecies Taricha torosa sierrae was elevated to full species level and it is now known as Taricha sierrae, the Sierra newt. Taricha torosa torosa has been retired and now all coastal populations are simply known as Taricha torosa, the California newt.

Range and habitat 
California newts reside in the coastal counties of California and in the southern Sierra Nevada and occupy a diverse array of habitats found near the small ponds and creeks where they breed, including woodlands and chaparral.

Description 
The California newt has warty, slate-gray skin on its back and bright orange-yellow skin underneath. It is very similar in appearance to the rough-skinned newt and they are often indistinguishable without dissection, but in general, the California newt has orange skin around the bottom of its eye while the Rough-skinned has gray skin at the bottom of its eye. The California newt also has eyes that protrude beyond the edge of the jaw line when viewed from above, while the eyes of the rough-skinned do not protrude, giving its head a more bullet-like appearance. The red-bellied newt is also similar but has dark irises vs. yellow in the California newt, more red coloration underneath, and a dark band across the vent that is lacking in the California newt..Newts are amphibians. They are related to salamanders (in a subfamily called Pleurodelinae). They live in North America, Europe and Asia. Their skin tends to be rougher than the skin of salamanders.

Reproduction 
Reproduction occurs generally between December and early May. Typically, the adult newts will return to the pool in which they hatched. After a mating dance, the male mounts the female and rubs his chin on her nose. He then attaches a spermatophore to the substrate, which she will retrieve into her cloaca.

The egg mass released by the female contains between seven and 30 eggs, and is roughly the consistency of a thick gelatin dessert. Typically, the egg masses are attached to stream plant roots or to rocky crevices in small pools of slow-moving water, but they have also been known to be attached to underwater rocks or leaf debris.

Adult newts typically leave the pools shortly after breeding has concluded, however, some adults may remain in the pools for an additional few months to feed. Larvae hatch sometime in early to midsummer, depending on local water temperature. Larvae are difficult to find in streams, as they blend in well with the sandy bottom, to which they usually stay close.

Toxicity and predation 
Like other genus Taricha members, the glands in the skin of Taricha torosa secrete the potent neurotoxin tetrodotoxin, which is hundreds of times more toxic than cyanide. This is the same toxin found in pufferfish and harlequin frogs. Researchers believe bacteria synthesize tetrodotoxin, and the animals that employ the neurotoxin acquire it through consumption of these bacteria. This neurotoxin is strong enough to kill most vertebrates, including humans. 

Due to their toxicity, California newts have few natural predators. Garter snakes are the most common, and some species have developed a genetic resistance to tetrodotoxin. The mutations in the snake's genes that conferred resistance to the toxin have resulted in a selective pressure that favors newts that produce more potent levels of toxin. Increases in newt toxicity then apply a selective pressure favoring snakes with mutations conferring even greater resistance. This evolutionary arms race has resulted in the newts producing levels of toxin far in excess of what is needed to kill any other conceivable predator.

Diet 
Earthworms, snails, slugs, woodlice, bloodworms, mosquito larvae, crickets, and other invertebrates are among the California newt's prey. Adult newts have also been known to cannibalize their own eggs and larvae. In the Sierra Nevada, the newt will also consume trout eggs. In an aquarium habitat, earthworms provide the newt with all necessary nutrients. Other natural prey items would benefit the captive newt. Pellets tend to be inappropriate for terrestrial caudates, and fish food should be avoided completely.

Conservation status 

Taricha torosa, the California newt, is currently a California Special Concern species (DFG-CSC). Some populations have been greatly reduced in southern California coastal streams due to the introduction of non-native, invasive species and human habitation. The mosquitofish (Gambusia affinis) and red swamp crayfish (Procambarus clarkii) have caused the greatest reduction in newt populations.

Introduced as fish bait and stock pond prey, red swamp crayfish are an incredibly aggressive, prolific, and stalwart species that will prey upon newt larvae and egg masses. The crayfish will also disrupt newt breeding via competition for space during the summer mating season and physically antagonizing adults. Crayfish will typically maul the adult newts with their claws, and subsequent infection can lead to death. Taricha torosa that are present in streams with introduced crayfish often sport tails with several notches removed.

References 

  Database entry includes a range map and justification for why this species is of least concern
 San Diego Natural History Museum

External links 

Taricha torosa (Rathke, 1833) Amphibian Species of the World. American Museum of Natural History
 CaliforniaHerps.com: Taricha torosa - California Newt – California newt facts.
 Mister-toad.com: mating behavior of California newts – with video.
 Caudata.org: Culture of California newts (Taricha torosa)  – guide to identifying species and keeping as a pet.

Newts
Amphibians of the United States
Newt
Newt
Fauna of the Sierra Nevada (United States)
Fauna of the San Francisco Bay Area
Natural history of the California Coast Ranges
Natural history of the Peninsular Ranges
Natural history of the Santa Monica Mountains
Natural history of the Transverse Ranges
Taxa named by Martin Rathke
Amphibians described in 1833